"Get Over Yourself" is a song by American musical group Eden's Crush. It was released on February 26, 2001, as the first single from their debut album, Popstars (2001). The track was produced by David Foster and Matthew Gerrard. It holds the distinction of making Eden's Crush the first female group to lead the sales chart with a debut single, reaching number eight in the United States and number one in Canada. It was one of only three singles in 2001 to have sold over 500,000 copies in the US. Billboard named the song number 81 on their list of the "100 Greatest Girl Group Songs of All Time".

Track listing

Tracks 8, 9, and 10 are hidden tracks, although track 8 is only hidden on some versions. It is referenced as "Get Over Yourself (Latin Version)."

Charts

Weekly charts

Year-end charts

Certifications

|}

Release history

References

2001 debut singles
2001 songs
Canadian Singles Chart number-one singles
London Records singles
Songs written by Matthew Gerrard